Kinnie is a Maltese soft drink.

Kinnie, kinnies, or variation, may refer to:

People
 Kinnie Laisné (born 1989) French tennis player
 Kinnie Larson, wife of U.S. musician Taylor Larson
 Kinnie Starr (born 1970) Canadian artist
 Kinnie Wagner (1903–1958) U.S. anti-Prohibition alcohol smuggler

Other uses
 Kinnie, a member of the otherkin subculture
 Kinnie, an alternate form of the given name and surname Kenny

See also

 McKinnie (surname)

 Kenney (disambiguation)
 Kenny (disambiguation)
 Kinne (disambiguation)
 Kinney (disambiguation)